Bays is a settlement in Nicholas County, West Virginia, United States on the border of Braxton and Webster Counties. It is at the intersection of Mill Creek Road and Old Turnpike Road. Its post office  has been closed.

References 

Unincorporated communities in Nicholas County, West Virginia
Unincorporated communities in West Virginia